Helicia attenuata is a plant in the family Proteaceae. The specific epithet attenuata means "drawn out", referring to the leaf base.

Description
Its bark is dark brown.

Distribution and habitat
Helicia attenuata is native to an area from peninsular Thailand and Malaysia east to Flores. Its habitat is forests from  altitude.

References

attenuata
Flora of Thailand
Flora of Malesia
Plants described in 1834